Eden Township is a township in Clinton County, Iowa, USA.  As of the 2000 census, its population was 856.

History
Eden Township was organized in 1856.

Geography
According to the USGS, it contains four cemeteries: Bowers-Dannatt-Hill, Cousin-Smith, Pehlam and Prairie Union.

The streams of Brophy Creek and Cherry Creek run through this township.

Notes

References
 USGS Geographic Names Information System (GNIS)

External links
 US-Counties.com
 City-Data.com

Townships in Clinton County, Iowa
Townships in Iowa
1856 establishments in Iowa
Populated places established in 1856